is a district of Minato, Tokyo, Japan. It consists of 1-chōme and 2-chōme. As of April 1, 2008, it has a total population of 323.

Geography
 occupies most of the district. It is now known as a home to Atago Green Hills, an urban complex constructed by building tycoon Minoru Mori.

Mount Atago
Located in the Atago district, Mount Atago is the highest natural mountain in the 23 special wards of Tokyo, with an elevation of 25.7 m. The  is housed on the mountain.

Education
Minato City Board of Education operates public elementary and junior high schools.

Atago 1-2-chōme are zoned to Onarimon Elementary School (御成門小学校) and Onarimon Junior High School (御成門中学校).

Atago is home to Kanazawa Institute of Technology's Tokyo Toranomon Campus.

References

Districts of Minato, Tokyo